The 1965–66 season was FC Dinamo București's 17th season in Divizia A. After four consecutive championships, Dinamo finishes only third this time. In the European Cup, Dinamo meets again Internazionale Milano. Despite winning the home game, Dinamo is eliminated by the title holder.

Results

European Cup 
Preliminary round – first leg

Second leg

First round – first leg

Second leg

Squad 

Goalkeepers: Ilie Datcu, Iuliu Uţu.

Defenders: Dumitru Ivan, Ion Nunweiller, Lică Nunweiller, Lazăr Pârvu, Cornel Popa, Mircea Stoenescu, Constantin Ștefan.

Midfielders: Vasile Gergely, Emil Petru, Octavian Popescu.

Forwards: Florea Dumitrache, Gheorghe Ene, Constantin Frățilă, Gheorghe Grozea, Ion Haidu, Vasile Ionescu, Mircea Lucescu, Radu Nunweiller, Ion Pîrcălab, Aurel Unguroiu, Iosif Varga.

Transfers 

Mircea Stoenescu and Iosif Varga are brought from Dinamo Piteşti. Varga and Marcel Pigulea are suspended for six months by the club. Florea Dumitrache made his debut in the first squad.

References 
 www.labtof.ro
 www.romaniansoccer.ro

1965
Association football clubs 1965–66 season
Dinamo
Romanian football clubs 1965–66 season